Burcy may refer to the following places in France:

Burcy, Calvados, in the Calvados département 
Burcy, Seine-et-Marne, in the Seine-et-Marne département